Zand District is a district (bakhsh) in Malayer County, Hamadan Province, Iran. At the 2006 census, its population was 14,426, in 3,695 families.  The district has one city: Zangeneh. The District has three rural districts (dehestan): Kamazan-e Olya Rural District, Kamazan-e Sofla Rural District, and Kamazan-e Vosta Rural District.

It is the namesake of the Zand dynasty.

References 

Malayer County
Districts of Hamadan Province